Ngairea murphyi is a species of small air-breathing land snail, a terrestrial pulmonate gastropod mollusk in the family Charopidae. This species is endemic to Australia.

References

Gastropods of Australia
Murphyi
Gastropods described in 1864
Endemic fauna of Australia
Taxonomy articles created by Polbot